Eupithecia sinuata is a moth in the family Geometridae first described by James Halliday McDunnough in 1946. It is found in the US states of Arizona and New Mexico.

The wingspan is about 23 mm.

References

Moths described in 1946
sinuata
Moths of North America